Jocelyn Alice Strang is a Canadian singer and songwriter. Formerly one half of Canadian indie soul pop duo Jocelyn & Lisa from Calgary, Alberta, Alice began performing as a solo artist in 2015. Her debut single, the 2015 summer hit "Jackpot", was certified Platinum in Canada in September 2016 and reached the top 15 on multiple Canadian commercial radio charts. Alice's second single, "Feels Right", was certified Gold in Canada in February 2018. In December 2018, Jocelyn Alice received official Gold certification for "Bound To You".

Alice received Canadian Radio Music Awards nominations in 2016 for Best New Group or Solo Artist: AC and Best New Group or Solo Artist: CHR. She also received Canadian Music Week Indie Awards nominations in 2016 for Pop Artist of the Year and Single of the Year.

Career

Early work 
Alice began her singing career at age 16 as a runner-up in Canada's Popstars. Her performances were inspired by her role models Amy Winehouse and Lauryn Hill. She then went on to work with producers Stacy Jones, Russell Broom, and Mitch Lee. Jocelyn has co-written music featured in the TV shows One Tree Hill and Pretty Little Liars,[2] the movie Dear Santa, and a television commercial in Canada for Shaw TV. In addition, she was the vocalist in a USA nationwide television commercial for Target, which featured a cover of the song "Reach Out of the Darkness".

Alice approached Lisa Jacobs in 2011 and suggested they write a song together. In early 2012, the pair decided to collaborate, birthing jocelyn & lisa. The pair charted #2 and #5 with their debut EP Weary Warrior, and were featured in numerous videos.

Solo career 
In 2014, Alice co-wrote "Jackpot" with Hello Moth. It was released on YouTube on December 25, 2014. The song reached #43 on the Billboard Canadian Hot 100 chart the week of July 25, 2015, and climbed to #38 the following week. Jackpot was #9 on Spotify's 10 most viral tracks in the United States that same week.

In December 2015, Alice signed a record deal with Sony affiliate Disruptor Records, where she has teamed up with producer Ryan Guldemond. Alice released her debut EP Little Devil in 2018.

Controversy
During her rendition of "O Canada" prior to the MLB All-Star game in Miami on July 11, 2017, Alice suddenly giggled after singing the line "God keep our Land", prompting a startled response from some players and fans in attendance.

Alice received severe backlash from news outlets and online commenters, with several observing that she had disrespected and "butchered" the anthem, dubbing the rendition an "absolute disaster" and "one of the worst attempts in recent memory", and criticizing her singing in general. Alice later tweeted that the reason she had giggled was because she had seen some fellow Canadians on the big screen and was "overcome with excitement".

Alice's bungled rendition came one year after another controversy regarding the anthem, when Remigio Pereira of the Tenors sang "We're all brothers and sisters. All lives matter to the brave", instead of the proper "With glowing hearts we see thee rise. The True North strong and free", prompting his split with the group.

Discography

Studio albums

Extended plays

Singles

As lead artist

Notes

As featured artist

Awards and nominations
Alice was nominated for two 2016 Canadian Radio Music Awards, Best New Group or Solo Artist: AC; and Best New Group or Solo Artist: CHR. She was also nominated for Pop Artist of the Year and Single of the Year at CMW's 2016 Indie Awards.

Alice received a Pop/Rock Award for "Jackpot" at the 2016 SOCAN Awards.

Alice received a No.1 Song Award from SOCAN for co-writing the chart-topping song "The Drugs" by Mother Mother.

Alice received official Platinum certification for "Jackpot" in September 2016.
Alice received official Gold certification for "Feels Right" in February 2018.
Alice received official Gold certification for "Bound To You" in December 2018.

References 

Year of birth missing (living people)
Living people
Canadian women singer-songwriters
Musicians from Calgary
21st-century Canadian women singers